Antonio de Raya Navarrete (1536 – 28 July 1606) was a Roman Catholic prelate who served as Bishop of Cuzco (1594–1606).

Biography
Antonio de Raya Navarrete was born in Baeza, Spain. On 6 June 1594, he was selected by the King of Spain and confirmed by Pope Clement VIII as Bishop of Cusco. On 27 November 1594, he was consecrated bishop by Pedro Castro Quiñones, Archbishop of Granada with Juan Fonseca, Bishop of Guadix, and Michael Fitzwalter, Auxiliary Bishop of Seville, serving as co-consecrators. He served as Bishop of Cusco until his death on 28 July 1606.

References

External links and additional sources
 (for Chronology of Bishops) 
 (for Chronology of Bishops) 

1536 births
1606 deaths
16th-century Roman Catholic bishops in Peru
Bishops appointed by Pope Clement VIII
Roman Catholic bishops of Cusco